| tries ={{#expr: 
 + 4 + 5 + 9
 + 8 + 4 + 3
 + 4 + 2 + 3
}}
| top point scorer    = Peter Grant (Emerging Springboks)(44 points)
| top try scorer      = Tonderai Chavhanga (Emerging Springboks)Marius Delport (Emerging Springboks)(3 tries)
| venue               = 
| attendance2         = 
| champions           = 
| count               = 1
| runner-up           = 
| website             = IRB Nations Cup
| previous year       = 2006
| previous tournament = 2006 IRB Nations Cup
| next year           = 2008
| next tournament     = 2008 IRB Nations Cup
}}
The 2007 IRB Nations Cup is the second edition of the international rugby union tournament, a competition created by the International Rugby Board.  It pits the "A" Teams of the stronger (Tier 1) rugby nations (Argentina Jaguars, Emerging Springboks and Italy A) against some of the Tier 2 and 3 nations (Romania, Namibia and Georgia).

Originally scheduled to take place in the Tineretului Stadium, Bucharest, Romania, in the event the matches took place at the city's Stadionul Arcul de Triumf.

Argentina Jaguars were the defending champions, but the Emerging Springboks were the overall winners.

The competition format was a modified round-robin whereby each team played 3 of the other 5 teams.  The competition was played over three match days, with three matches played consecutively on each day.

Final standings

Results

Round 1
IRB Report

Round 2
IRB Report

Round 3
IRB Report

Top scorers

Top points scorers

Source: irb.com

Top try scorers

Source: irb.com

See also 

2007 IRB Pacific Nations Cup

References

External links
IRB Schedule
IRB Kick off times
IRB Italy A and Argentina A squads
IRB Romania, Namibia, Georgia and Emerging Springboks squads

2007
2007 rugby union tournaments for national teams
International rugby union competitions hosted by Romania
2006–07 in Romanian rugby union
2006–07 in Italian rugby union
2007 in South African rugby union
2007 in Argentine rugby union
2007 in Georgian sport
2007 in Namibian sport
Sport in Bucharest